Valērijs Kargins or Valery Mikhailovich Kargin (born March 27, 1961, in Riga) is a Latvian economist and banker was the president of Parex Banka, from 1998 to 2008. In October 2000, he and Viktor Krasovitsky had accumulated over 200 million lats together. He created the first travel agency and the first currency exchange corporation in the Soviet Union.

Biography 
Kargins was born in Riga on March 27, 1961. His parents were Mikhail Kargin b. 1926 in Novosibirsk Oblast) and Dina Grozdeva b. 15 October 1931 in Tatarsky District, Novosibirsk Oblast), who was raised by a Soviet serviceman. After his parents were married in 1951 at Novosibirsk where his father was a senior lieutenant in the Soviet Army, they moved to Riga. However, he was raised by his stepfather Georgy whom the young Kargin considered his real father. He has two brothers: Georgy, who is older, and Vadim ( b. 1969), who is a younger step-brother. He worked at Komutator in Riga for two months as a loader but he did not enjoy physical labor so he enrolled at university to study journalism. In 1983, he finished the faculty of journalism at the University of Latvia. Then, from 1983 to 1991, he opened one of the first travel agencies in the Soviet Union, in the Latvian Soviet Socialist Republic (Latvian SSR). Then, between 1988 and 1992, he became the director of Parex corporation, which is a travel agency and currency exchange that he and his business partner  formed. In 1991, he became the first to create a currency exchange corporation in the Union of Soviet Socialist Republics (USSR). The following year, he became the president of Parex Bank. From 1998 to 2008, he was the president and the chairman of Parex Bank.

In 2003, he was the richest man in the Baltics with a wealth of around €300 million.

In October 2008 before the demise of Parex Bank in November 2008, Kargins wealth was estimated by Baltic Screen to be €309 million (220 million lats).

Personal
Ksenia Sobchak interviewed Kargins in Riga about the time that she and   released the perfume Married to a Millionaire.

He has two sons Rem (b. 1982) and Maksims (b. 1987) with Tatyana Kargins from his first marriage which ended in divorce in 2006 and, from his second marriage, a daughter Valerija Maija (b. 1 February 2006) with Anna Barinova, a Latvian tennis star and 26 years his younger.

Maksims Kargins, a son of Valery Kargins, was under investigation by Panama's Financial Investigation Section of the Money Laundering Crimes Division in the Criminal Investigations Department of the National Directorate of Judicial Investigation who requested files from Mossack Fonseca about Maksim Kargins but revealed that he is clean due to a legitimate use. His company never made a profit and thus was closed lawfully (his use of Mossack Fonseca's services does not indicate any wrongdoing).

After Maksims Kargins was attacked by Latvijas Televīzija (LTV), he filed a lawsuit against LTV, winning the case in the first and second hearings. LTV has officially apologized to Maksims Kargins, making him the only person in the family that the government of Latvia has admitted bad game to.

References

External links 
 Parex Group Online
 Valery Kargin on Kompromat.lv

1961 births
Living people
Businesspeople from Riga
Latvian Jews
Communist Party of the Soviet Union members
Latvian bankers
Latvian economists
University of Latvia alumni